The European Team Championships  (ETC) are the international squash competition played between teams representing different nations organised by the European Squash Federation. Countries enter teams of four or five players to represent them in the championships. In each round of the competition, teams face each other in a best-of-four singles matches contest. Each competition is held once every year.

Past results

Men's championship

Women's championship

Statistics

Titles by country

Men

Women

Medals summary

Men

Women

See also 
 Squash
 European Squash Federation
 European Squash Individual Championships
 World Team Squash Championships

References

External links 
 European Squash Federation website Archive Results
 ETC Squash 2012

European championships
Squash in Europe
Squash tournaments
Squash records and statistics